Iron(III) phosphate, also ferric phosphate, is the inorganic compound with the formula FePO4.  Several related materials are known, including four polymorphs of FePO4 and two polymorphs of the dihydrate FePO4·(H2O)2.  These materials find few technical applications as well as occurring in the mineral kingdom.

Structure 
The most common form of FePO4 adopts the structure  of α-quartz. As such the material consists of tetrahedral Fe(III) and phosphate sites.  As such the P and Fe have tetrahedral molecular geometry.  At high pressures, a phase change occurs to a more dense structure with octahedral Fe centres.  Two orthorhombic structures and a monoclinic phase are also known.  In the two polymorphs of the dihydrate, the Fe centre is octahedral with two mutually cis water ligands.

Uses 
Iron(III) phosphate can be used in steel and metal manufacturing processes. When bonded to a metal surface, iron phosphate prevents further oxidation of the metal. Its presence is partially responsible for the corrosion resistance of the iron pillar of Delhi.

Iron phosphate coatings are commonly used in preparation for painting or powder coating, in order to increase adhesion to the iron or steel substrate, and prevent corrosion, which can cause premature failure of subsequent coating processes. It can also be used for bonding fabrics, wood, and other materials to iron or steel surfaces.

Anhydrous iron phosphate has been investigated as an intercalation electrode in a lithium-ion battery despite having low electronic conductivity.

Pesticide
Iron phosphate is one of the few molluscicides approved for use in the practice of organic farming.

Pesticide pellets contain iron phosphate plus a chelating agent, such as EDTA. The Research Institute of Organic Agriculture (FiBL) reported the EDTA content and stated products were likely to be no safer than metaldehyde baits. Ferric phosphate slug and snail baits marketed in the U.S. contain EDTA.

Legislation
Iron(III) phosphate is not allowed as food additive in the European Union. It was withdrawn from the list of allowed substances in the directive 2002/46/EC in 2007.

See also
 Strengite, hydrated ferric phosphate
 Iron(II) phosphate, commonly known as ferrous phosphate, the lower phosphate of iron
 Lithium iron phosphate battery, a battery that uses iron phosphate
 Phosphate conversion coating, an industrial process used to protect newly manufactured iron and steel from corrosion

References

External links

Phosphates
Iron(III) compounds